Becquerel is a 167 km-diameter crater at 22.1°N, 352.0°E on Mars, in Arabia Terra in Oxia Palus quadrangle. It is named after Antoine H. Becquerel.

Photographs by the Mars Global Surveyor revealed layered sedimentary rocks in the crater. The layers appear to be only a few meters thick and show little variations in thickness. Recent studies with HiRISE have determined the exact thickness of the layers. The 66 layers measured showed one group of layers to average  and another group to average  in thickness. Patterns like this are usually produced on Earth through the effects of water; volcanic deposits would not produce ash or laval flows of such regular thickness and in any event, there are no nearby volcanic vents.

There are cyclic variations in the thickness of the exposed sedimentary layers, possibly indicating cyclic variations in environmental conditions while the sediment was being laid down. Most of the layers are parallel to each other, suggesting they formed by vertical settling, but a few are cross-bedded, indicating that at the time that the layers were deposited the sediment was transported along the ground surface by wind or water. The sedimentary material appears to be easily eroded and active wind erosion may be continuing to the current day.

Parts of the mound in Becquerel crater show radial faults, These may be the result of a salt diapir.   On Earth these are associated with methane seepage.  Perhaps the methane detected on Mars from time to time is coming from these faults.

Some parts of Becquerel show light-toned layers. Light-toned rocks on Mars have been associated with hydrated minerals like sulfates.  The Mars rover Opportunity examined such layers close-up with several instruments.  Scientists are excited about finding hydrated minerals such as sulfates and clays on Mars because they are usually formed in the presence of water.  Places that contain clays and/or other hydrated minerals would be good places to look for evidence of life.

Many craters once contained lakes. Because some crater floors show deltas, we know that water had to be present for some time. Dozens of deltas have been spotted on Mars. Deltas form when sediment is washed in from a stream entering a quiet body of water. It takes a bit of time to form a delta, so the presence of a delta is exciting; it means water was there for a time, maybe for many years. Primitive organisms may have developed in such lakes; hence, some craters may be prime targets for the search for evidence of life on the Red Planet.

Gallery

Topographic Map

See also

References

External links 

 "Flying Over Becquerel Crater on Mars", Space Video on YouTube
 Mars Express HRSC - Press release on Becquerel crater 05.09.2013 HRSC Press Release #621 - Becquerel Crater

Impact craters on Mars
Oxia Palus quadrangle